The bilingual frog (Crinia bilingua) is a species of frog in the family Myobatrachidae.
It is endemic to Australia.
Its natural habitats are moist savanna, intermittent rivers, and swamps.

References

Crinia
Amphibians of Western Australia
Amphibians of the Northern Territory
Taxonomy articles created by Polbot
Amphibians described in 1980
Frogs of Australia